Johannes Wijnandus "Johan" Remkes (born 15 June 1951) is a Dutch politician and nonprofit director who served as Deputy Prime Minister of the Netherlands from 2002 to 2003 under Prime Minister Jan Peter Balkenende. He is a member of the People's Party for Freedom and Democracy (VVD).

Remkes studied Economics at the University of Groningen obtaining a Bachelor of Economics degree. Remkes served as chairman of the political youth organisation JOVD from July 1975 until November 1977. Remkes worked as member of the Provincial-Executive of Groningen from May 1982 until October 1993. Remkes became a member of the House of Representatives on 26 October 1993 serving as a frontbencher and spokesperson for Housing. After the election of 1998 Remkes was appointed as State Secretary for Housing, Spatial Planning and the Environment under the Second Kok cabinet taking office on 3 August 1998. After the election of 2002 Remkes was appointed as Deputy Prime Minister and Minister of the Interior and Kingdom Relations in the First Balkenende cabinet, which took office on 22 July 2002 but fell just 87 days into its term. After the election of 2003 Remkes continued as Minister of the Interior and Kingdom Relations in the Second Balkenende cabinet. The cabinet fell on 30 June 2006 and was replaced with the caretaker Third Balkenende cabinet with Remkes retaining his position. After the election of 2006 Remkes returned to the House of Representatives on 30 November 2006 and served as a frontbencher and spokesperson for the Interior. In March 2010, Remkes announced that he would not stand for the election of 2010 and declined to serve in new cabinet.

Remkes continued to be active in politics and in June 2010 was nominated as the next King's Commissioner of North Holland serving from 1 July 2010 until 1 January 2019. Remkes also became active in the public sector as non-profit director and serves on several state commissions and councils on behalf of the government. In September 2019, Remkes was appointed as Acting Mayor of The Hague serving from 11 October 2019 until 1 July 2020. 

From 19 April 2021 until 1 December 2021 Remkes was Acting King's Commissionner of Limburg.

Early career
Remkes was born in Zuidbroek, Groningen. Remkes applied at the University of Groningen in June 1970 majoring in Economics and obtaining a Bachelor of Economics degree in June 1972. Remkes served on the Municipal Council of Groningen from April 1978 until May 1982 and served on the Provincial-Council of Groningen from May 1978 until October 1993 and as a member of the Provincial-Executive of Groningen from May 1982 until October 1993 and served again on the Municipal Council of Groningen from May 1994 until July 1996.

House of Representatives
Remkes became a Member of the House of Representatives after the resignation of Nell Ginjaar-Maas taking office on 26 October 1993 and served as a frontbencher and spokesperson for Housing and deputy spokesperson for the Interior, Economic Affairs, Tax and Customs and Media.

Cabinets
After the election of 1998 Remkes was appointed as State Secretary for Housing, Spatial Planning and the Environment in the Cabinet Kok II taking office on 3 August 1998. The Cabinet Kok II resigned on 16 April 2002 following the conclusions of the NIOD report into the Srebrenica massacre during the Bosnian War and continued to serve in a demissionary capacity. After the election of 2002 Remkes returned as a Member of the House of Representatives on 23 May 2002. Following the cabinet formation of 2002 Remkes was appointed as Deputy Prime Minister and Minister of the Interior and Kingdom Relations in the Cabinet Balkenende I taking office on 22 July 2002. 

The Cabinet Balkenende I fell just 87 days into its term following a major leadership crisis in the Pim Fortuyn List (LPF) party and resigned on 16 October 2002 and the cabinet continued to serve in a demissionary capacity. election of 2003 Remkes again returned as a Member of the House of Representatives on 30 January 2003. Following the cabinet formation of 2003 Remkes continued as Minister of the Interior and Kingdom Relations but the position of Deputy Prime Minister was taken over by Minister of Finance Gerrit Zalm in the Cabinet Balkenende II taking office on 27 May 2003.

On 29 June 2006 the Democrats 66 retracted their support for the cabinet Balkenende II after criticizing the way Minister for Integration and Immigration Rita Verdonk (VVD) had handled the crisis around the naturalization of her party fellow elected to the House of Representatives Ayaan Hirsi Ali. On 7 July 2006 a rump cabinet Third Balkenende cabinet. He returned as a member of the House of Representatives after the inauguration of the Fourth Balkenende cabinet, serving from 30 November 2006 to 17 June 2010.

King's Commissioner North Holland
Remkes remained in active politics, in June 2010 he was nominated as the next Kings's Commissioner of North Holland serving from 1 July 2010 until 1 January 2019. He also served on several state commissions and councils on behalf of the government (Parliamentary Reform Commission, Council for Public Administration, Advisory Council for Spatial Planning and the Van Thijn Commission). After his retirement Remkes occupies numerous seats as a corporate director and nonprofit director for supervisory boards in the business and industry world and several international non-governmental organizations and research institutes. In 2018, he made known he would step down from the position in January 2019 to definitely retire from politics. He has been succeeded by former Haarlemmermeer alderman and also VVD politician Arthur van Dijk.

Decorations

References

External links

Official
  J.W. (Johan) Remkes, Parlement.com

 
 

 

 

 

 
 

 
 

 
 

 
 

1951 births
Living people
20th-century Dutch civil servants
20th-century Dutch politicians
21st-century Dutch businesspeople
21st-century Dutch civil servants
21st-century Dutch politicians
Commanders of the Order of the Netherlands Lion
Commandeurs of the Légion d'honneur
Deputy Prime Ministers of the Netherlands
Dutch agnostics
Dutch corporate directors
Dutch nonprofit directors
Dutch nonprofit executives
Grand Officers of the Order of Leopold II
King's and Queen's Commissioners of Limburg
King's and Queen's Commissioners of North Holland
Mayors of The Hague
Members of the House of Representatives (Netherlands)
Members of the Provincial Council of Groningen
Members of the Provincial-Executive of Groningen
Ministers of Kingdom Relations of the Netherlands
Ministers of the Interior of the Netherlands
Municipal councillors of Groningen (city)
Officers of the Order of Orange-Nassau

People from Menterwolde
People's Party for Freedom and Democracy politicians
State Secretaries for Housing and Spatial Planning of the Netherlands
University of Groningen alumni